"Nothing's News" is a song written and recorded by American country music artist Clint Black.  It was released in June 1990 as the fifth and final single from his debut album Killin' Time.  It was his first single not to chart at number 1 on the  Billboard Hot Country Singles & Tracks chart but it did reach number 1 on The Canadian RPM country Tracks chart.

Content
The song is about getting together with good friends at the bar and thinking about the times when life was better.

Chart performance
"Nothing's News" would only reach number 3 on the Hot Country Songs chart. It became his fifth consecutive number one hit on the Canadian RPM charts where it spent one week at number 1 beginning September 15, 1990.

Year-end charts

References

1990 singles
Clint Black songs
Songs written by Clint Black
Song recordings produced by James Stroud
Song recordings produced by Mark Wright (record producer)
RCA Records singles
1989 songs